Zhao Zhizhong may refer to:
Zhao Zhizhong (fencer) (born 1958), Chinese fencer
Zhao Zhizhong (ethnologist), Chinese ethnology professor